The Halosphaeriaceae are a family of fungi in the Sordariomycetes class, subclass Hypocreomycetidae. As of 2015, Halosphaeriaceae is the family with the largest number of marine fungi, with 141 species distributed among 59 genera.

Genera
As accepted in 2020;

Alisea  – 1 sp.
Amphitrite  – 1 sp.
Aniptodera  – 21 spp.
Aniptosporopsis  – 1 sp.
Anisostagma  – 1 sp.
Antennospora  – 2 spp.
Appendichordella  – 1 sp.
Arenariomyces  – 5 spp.
Ascosacculus  – 1 sp.
Bathyascus  – 5 spp.
Buxetroldia  – 1 sp.
Carbosphaerella  – 2 spp.
Ceriosporopsis  – 9 spp.
Chadefaudia  – 6 spp.
Cirrenalia  – 15 spp.
Corallicola  – 1 sp.
Corollospora  – 25 spp.
Cucullosporella  – 1 sp.
Cucurbitinus  - 2 spp.
Ebullia  – 1 sp.
Fluviatispora  – 3 spp.
Gesasha  – 3 spp.
Haiyanga  – 1 sp.
Haligena  – 1 sp.
Halosarpheia  – 8 spp.
Halosphaeria  – 1 sp.
Halosphaeriopsis  – 1 sp.
Havispora  – 1 sp.
Iwilsoniella  – 1 sp.
Kitesporella  – 1 sp.
Kochiella  – 1 sp.
Lautisporopsis  – 1 sp.
Lignincola  – 2 spp.
Limacospora  – 1 sp.
Luttrellia  – 4 spp.

Magnisphaera  – 2 spp.
Marinospora  – 2 spp.
Moana  – 1 sp.
Morakotiella  – 1 sp.
Nais  – 3 spp.
Natantispora  – 3 spp.
Nautosphaeria  – 1 sp.
Neptunella  – 1 sp.
Nereiospora  – 2 spp.
Nimbospora  – 1 sp.

Oceanitis  – 4 spp.
Ocostaspora  – 1 sp.
Okeanomyces  – 1 sp.
Ondiniella  – 1 sp.
Ophiodeira  – 1 sp.
Panorbis  – 1 sp.
Paraaniptodera  – 1 sp.
Phaeonectriella  – 1 sp.
Pileomyces  – 1 sp.
Praelongicaulis  – 1 sp.
Pseudolignincola  – 1 sp.
Remispora  – 5 spp.
Saagaromyces  – 3 spp.
Sablicola  – 1 sp.

Thalassogena  – 1 sp.
Thalespora  – 1 sp.
Tinhaudeus  – 1 sp.
Tirispora  – 1 sp.
Toriella  – 1 sp.
Trailia  – 1 sp.
Trichomaris  – 1 sp.
Tubakiella  – 1 sp.
Tunicatispora  – 1 sp.

References

Ascomycota families
Microascales
Taxa described in 1972